Scorpion is a 2018 Uzbek action drama thriller film directed by Muhlisa Azizova and written by Rashid Malikov, Abduhamil Sodiqov, and Bob Underwood. The film was features an ensemble cast that includes Farhod Mahmudov, Shahzoda Matchanova, Karim Mirhadiyev, Yulduz Rajabova, Akbar Rasulov, Vyacheslav Razbegaev, Raʼno Shodiyeva and Murat Yıldırım.

Scorpion premiered in ProLogue International Film Festival on November 28, 2018, and was released in the Uzbekistan on December 1, 2018. The filming took place in cities of Uzbekistan, Russia and Morocco. The soundtrack of the film was performed by the famous singer Valeriya.

Plot 
An agent of the Uzbek special services, Timur Saliev, is conducting an operation to seize the Scorpion terrorist group when he learns that his brother, whom he considered dead, is alive and belongs to this very organization.  Risking his life and career, Saliev follows in his brother's footsteps into a country engulfed in chaos and the mercilessness of war. Suspected of treason, he faces a choice that will affect not only his life, but also the peace in the region.

Cast 
 Farhod Mahmudov as Temur Soliyev
 Akbar Rasulov as Jahongir Soliyev
 Murat Yıldırım as Yassir
 Vyacheslav Razbegaev as Peter McCallister
 Yulduz Rajabova as Catherine Trammel
 Shahzoda Matchanova as Petra
 Karim Mirhadiyev as General Mahmudov
 Raʼno Shodiyeva as Umarova

References

External links 
 
 Official trailer

2018 films
2018 action thriller films
2018 action drama films
Uzbekistani drama films
Uzbek-language films